The Confetto di Sulmona is a typical sweet specialty of the city of Sulmona in province of L'Aquila, Abruzzo, where there is the oldest sweet factory.

Confetto di Sulmona it is listed as a traditional Italian food product (P.A.T.) by the Ministry of Agricultural, Food and Forestry Policies.

Confetti di Sulmona sugar-coated almonds, often rapped in bright colors and shaped as flowers.

References 

Cuisine of Abruzzo
Italian cuisine